Ratu Etuate Navakamocea Mataitini (1887 – 17 November 1967) was a Fijian chief and politician. He was Vunivalu of Rewa, and a member of the Legislative Council.

Biography
Mataitini was a member of the Great Council of Chiefs for over thirty years. He also served as a nominated member of the Legislative Council for several years until 1950.

He died in Suva in November 1967 at the age of 79. He was married three times, and had 13 children.

References

1887 births
Fijian chiefs
Members of the Legislative Council of Fiji
1967 deaths